Salzburg Global Seminar is a non-profit organization that challenges current and future leaders to shape a better world. It convenes programs on health care, education, culture, finance, technology, public policy, media, human rights, corporate governance, philanthropy, and the environment. Programs regularly occur at Schloss Leopoldskron in Salzburg, Austria. Since 1947, Salzburg Global has welcomed more than 40,000 participants, known as Salzburg Global Fellows, from more than 170 countries.

Organizational history

In 1946, Clemens Heller, a native Austrian attending graduate school at Harvard University, "envisioned a cultural bridge spanning the Atlantic not only by introducing the demoralized Europeans to all sorts of American cultural achievements, but also by stimulating a fruitful exchange between European national cultures and America."

Richard "Dick" Campbell Jr., an undergraduate student and Scott Elledge, an English instructor also at Harvard, became allies in the realization of this project. Though Harvard was unwilling to support the project, they were able to convince the Harvard Student Council to be the official sponsors of the Seminar.   The three founders raised the majority of funds. It was also necessary for the trio to obtain permission from the State Department for entrance into Allied Occupied Austria.

Legend contends that in 1947, Heller bumped into Helene Thimig on a subway train in New York. The widow of theater producer Max Reinhardt had been friends with Heller's parents before the war and had a summer home in Salzburg named Schloss Leopoldskron.  Heller explained his plans and Thimig said she would rent Max’s Schloss at a low rate for the purpose of a summer school.  Dick Campbell is quoted as saying "We hope to create at least one small center in which young Europeans from all countries, and of all political convictions, could meet for a month in concrete work under favorable living conditions, and to lay the foundation for a possible permanent center of intellectual discussion in Europe."

The first session, officially called "The Harvard Student Council's Salzburg Seminar in American Civilization,"  lasted six weeks in the summer of 1947 and brought together men and women from eighteen countries, including countries from behind the Iron Curtain. Faculty for the first session included literary historian F. O. Matthiessen; anthropologist Margaret Mead; economists Walt Rostow and Wassily Leontief; writer and literary critic Alfred Kazin among others.

The Seminar was formally incorporated on April 20, 1950. Dexter Perkins, Frederick Muhlhauser, Herbert P. Gleason, Clyde and Florence Kluckhohn, Wassily Leontief and Richard Campbell all signed the papers of the Salzburg Seminar in American Studies. By 1950, the Seminar developed into more than a summer school and session topics were expanded beyond American Studies.

During President Tuthill’s second year, he told the Board that in 1979 "American Law would be the only ‘American’ subject offered."  The Seminar had become so global in focus, that he twice urged that the Seminar be renamed "Salzburg Seminar in International Studies."  In 2007, the Seminar changed its name to the Salzburg Global Seminar in order to better reflect the increasingly global, rather than American, outlook of the Seminar and the focus of its course offerings.

Although the Seminar grew to include a more global focus, American Studies themes continued to be present at  Salzburg Global Seminar. In 1994, the Seminar returned to its roots by establishing  the American Studies Center.  From 1994 to 2002 thirty-two sessions on American themes were held. In 2003 the Salzburg Seminar American Studies Association (SSASA) was created. SSASA organizes a yearly symposium devoted to a broad American Studies theme such as politics, literature, history  or cultural studies.

Today, Salzburg Global Seminar holds sessions that focus "on critical issues confronting the global community, covering topics as diverse as health care and education, culture and economics, geopolitics and philanthropy... Seminars are designed to be participatory: prompting candid dialogue, fresh thinking and constantly in the search for innovative but practical solutions."

Home of the Salzburg Global Seminar
Prince-Archbishop of Salzburg Count Leopold Anton Eleutherius von Firmian (1679-1744) commissioned Schloss Leopoldskron in 1736. The chapel of Leopoldskron was consecrated in 1744. Archbishop von Firmian handed the Fideikommiss charter to his nephew, Lakantz, Count of Firmian. The Archbishop died in October 1744, and was buried in the Salzburg's cathedral while his heart was interred in Leopoldskron's chapel.
The Schloss remained in the possession of the Firmian family until 1837. It was then sold to the owner of a local shooting gallery, George Zierer, who stripped the palace of most of its valuable interior decorations, including paintings, etchings, and sculptures.

The Schloss had several owners during the 19th century (including two waiters who wanted to use it as a hotel, ex-King Ludwig I of Bavaria and a banker) until it was bought in 1918 by the famous theatre director Max Reinhardt, co-founder of the Salzburg Festival. 
During World War II the Schloss was confiscated as Jewish property.  After the war, and Max Reinhardt's death, the Schloss was returned to the Reinhardt Estate. After two quick sales, first to a bank and then the City of Salzburg, Schloss Leopoldskron was sold to the "Salzburg Seminar in American Studies" in 1959.  The purchase price of the Schloss and 17 acres was "$77,000, plus $10,500 in solicitors' fees." In 1973 the adjacent Meierhof, a part of the original Firmian estate, was also purchased by the Seminar.

In 2014, the Meierhof underwent a substantial two-month renovation which incorporated the 18th century style of the Schloss. For instance, the headboards were crafted from historic shutters. In addition, three rooms were created to reference the 1965 movie "The Sound of Music" which was filmed, in part, on the Schloss grounds. In addition to being the home of Salzburg Global Seminar, the Schloss Leopoldskron and the Meierhof now operate as a fully functioning hotel.

Leadership of Salzburg Global Seminar
 Martin Weiss, 2022-present
 Stephen Salyer, 2005–2022
 Amy Hastings, (acting) 2005
 Olin Clyde Robison, 1991–2005
 Bradford Morse, 1986–1991
 Herbert P. Gleason, (acting) 1985-1986
 John W. Tuthill, 1977–1985
 Thomas H. Eliot, 1971–1976
 Paul M. Herzog, 1965–1971
 Arthur S. Adams, 1962–1965
 Dexter Perkins, 1950–1961

Mission 
The mission of Salzburg Global Seminar is to challenge current and future leaders to shape a better world. The Salzburg Global Seminar convenes imaginative thinkers from different cultures and institutions, organizes problem-focused initiatives, supports leadership development, and engages opinion-makers through active communication networks, all in partnership with leading institutions from around the world and across different sectors of society.

Areas of Impact
Salzburg Global's programs are organized under five thematic headings:
 Peace and justice 
 Arts and culture
 Education  
 Health

Programs 
 Salzburg Global American Studies Program
 The Salzburg Academy on Media and Global Change
 Salzburg Global Forum for Young Cultural Innovation
 Culture, Arts and Society
 Education for Tomorrow’s World
 Health and Healthcare Innovation
 Global Innovations on Youth Violence, Safety and Justice
 Parks for the Planet Forum
 Japan-India Transformative Technology Network
 Asia Peace Innovators Forum
 Salzburg Global Finance Forum
 Salzburg Global Corporate Governance Forum
 Salzburg Global Law and Technology Forum

Salzburg Cutler Fellowship Program 
In 2012, Salzburg Global Seminar launched the Salzburg Cutler Law Fellows Program, named in memory of Lloyd N. Cutler, former White House Counsel for two presidents and Chairman of the Board of Salzburg Global Seminar. The program is a partnership with ten leading U.S. law schools in order to identify and mentor  young leaders in international law and legal practice.

Notable Salzburg Global Fellows 
Alumni of Sessions of Salzburg Global Seminar are referred to as Salzburg Global Fellows. The Salzburg Global Fellowship consists of more than 30,000 individuals from 169 countries around the world who have participated in Salzburg Global Seminar programs since 1947.”

References

External links
 Salzburg Global Seminar
 Schloss Leopoldskron

Non-profit organisations based in Austria